Grady Franklin Stiles Jr. (June 26, 1937 – November 29, 1992) was an American freak show performer and murderer. His deformity was the genetic condition ectrodactyly, in which the fingers and toes are fused together to form claw-like extremities. Because of this, Stiles performed under the stage name "Lobster Boy".

Family history

According to Grady's father, the Stiles family had a long history of ectrodactyly, dating back to 1840. Grady Stiles Jr. was the fourth child of Grady F. Stiles Sr. and his wife Edna. Capitalizing on his deformity, Grady Stiles Sr. was a sideshow attraction in a traveling carnival. After Grady Jr. was born he was folded into his father's sideshow act at the age of seven. Stiles married twice and had four children, two of whom also had ectrodactyly. Stiles and his two children toured together as The Lobster Family. When not traveling with the carnival, the Stiles family lived in Gibsonton, Florida, where many other carnival performers lived during the winter season.

Stiles was an alcoholic and was abusive to his family. Due to his ectrodactyly, he was unable to walk. While he sometimes used a wheelchair, he most commonly used his hands and arms for locomotion. He developed substantial upper body strength that, when combined with his bad temper and alcoholism, made him dangerous to others. Grady's first wife, Mary Teresa, left him to marry Harry Glenn Newman, a midget who was billed as the "Smallest Man in the World".

Murder and conviction
In 1978 in Pittsburgh, Pennsylvania, Stiles shot and killed his oldest daughter's fiancé on the eve of their wedding, as Stiles did not approve of him. He was brought to trial, where he openly confessed to killing the man and was convicted of third-degree murder. He was not sent to prison as no state institution was equipped to care for an inmate with ectrodactyly. Stiles was instead sentenced to house arrest and fifteen years probation.

Later life and death
Stiles stopped drinking thereafter, and during this period remarried his first wife, Mary Teresa. However, he soon began drinking again and his family claimed that he became even more abusive. In 1992, Teresa, together with her son from a previous marriage, Harry Glenn Newman Jr., hired a seventeen-year-old sideshow performer named Chris Wyant to kill Stiles for $1500. Mary was convicted of manslaughter; Harry was convicted of first-degree murder and received a life sentence; and Christopher was convicted of second-degree murder and received a 27-year sentence.

Stiles' son, Grady Stiles III, disputes the claim that Teresa had him murdered. According to him, his mother, Teresa, and father were arguing. Teresa had said 'Something needs to be done.' Teresa's son overheard this, and went to a neighbor and repeated those words. Shortly after this happened, as Stiles smoked a cigarette while watching television on the sofa, the neighbor entered his home with a semi-automatic pistol and shot him in the head twice, killing him. Stiles was reportedly widely disliked in his community, so much so that only 10 people came to his funeral, and nobody volunteered as a pallbearer to carry his coffin.

Media

Fred Rosen wrote a book on the case called Lobster Boy: The Bizarre Life and Brutal Death of Grady Stiles Jr., and E! made a True Hollywood Story episode based on the case titled "The Murder of Lobster Boy". A&E Network also made a City Confidential episode based on the case called "Gibsonton: The Last Side Show".

Stiles' likeness appears on the album cover for Silverchair's Freak Show.

A person like Grady, going by the name of "Lobster Boy", appears in a Deadpool comic. Deadpool was hired to assassinate him, but fails when he figures out he is possessed by Xaphan, a fallen angel, and starts possessing the souls. He was later saved by the two Ghost Riders, but at the end is shot again in the head by Deadpool for being cruel to other freaks.

On HBO's Carnivàle, set on a traveling carnival during the Great Depression, the central character, Ben Hawkins, is sent out by his employers to investigate rumors of a "Scorpion Boy" in a nearby town in the episode "Lonnigan, Texas".

American Freakshow: The Terrible Tale of Sloth Boy, a graphic novel published by IDW Publishing, tells the tale of Dante Browning, a carnival sideshow performer with clawed hands who, because of his abuse and cruelty to his family, is shot to death by a hit man hired by his wife and stepson while in his home in Gibsonton, Florida.

American Horror Story: Freak Show has a Lobster Boy character. It also includes a small statue in the likeness of Stiles in the opening credits. In addition, a snapshot of Stiles is briefly seen at the American Morbidity Museum in the third episode ("Edward Mordrake, Part I").

John Strohm wrote "Ballad of Lobster Boy," inspired by Grady Stiles and recorded the song for his 1999 album Vestavia.

In his memoir Tibetan Peach Pie, author Tom Robbins refers to Stiles' life and death.

American History comedy Podcast, The Dollop, did an episode in 2014 discussing Grady Stiles.

References

External links 
 Interview with Fred Rosen
 Sideshow World Article
 Grady Stiles – Murderous Lobster Boy
 
 Murder in the Tropics

1937 births
1992 deaths
1978 murders in the United States
1992 murders in the United States
American murder victims
American people convicted of murder
American people with disabilities
Deaths by firearm in Florida
People convicted of murder by Pennsylvania
People murdered in Florida
Male murder victims
Sideshow performers
People from Gibsonton, Florida
People from Pittsburgh